The Ziegenkopf is a hill, near Blankenburg in the Harz mountains in the German state of Saxony-Anhalt.

Geographical location 
The Ziegenkopf lies just under 1 km southwest of Blankenburg and about 200 m south of the  B 27 federal highway to Hüttenrode.

Observation tower 
Over 100 years ago an observation tower, 30 metres high with a stone base and wooden upper storey, was erected on the summit of the Ziegenkopf, with good views over to the famous Brocken. Next to it is a hilltop restaurant.

External links 
Home page of the  "Ziegenkopf" hilltop restaurant and B&B "Ziegenkopf"

Mountains and hills of Saxony-Anhalt
Hills of the Harz
Blankenburg (Harz)